Tararua College is a secondary school in Pahiatua, New Zealand, with approximately 407 students.

History
Tararua College opened in 1960. Like most New Zealand state secondary school opened in the 1960s, the school was built to the Nelson common design plan, characterised by two-storey H-shaped classroom blocks, of which the school has one. The regional station Tararua TV was started in 2004, in an egg-carton lined room at the school. In 2006, pupil brawls and abuse of teachers at the school was effectively stopped with the introduction of a ban on student cellphones. Later that year a student teacher was forced to resign after admitting an affair with a pupil of the school.

Notable former pupils

 Heather McRae, principal of Diocesan School for Girls in Auckland.
 Roger Sowry, government cabinet minister, former head boy
 Michael Mason, New Zealand Blackcap cricketer
 Tara Drysdale, New Zealand Blackstick
 Dame Diane Robertson, community leader

References

External links
 School website

Secondary schools in Manawatū-Whanganui
Tararua District
New Zealand secondary schools of Nelson plan construction